Elections in Oregon are all held using a Vote by Mail (VBM) system. This means that all registered voters receive their ballots via postal delivery and can vote from their homes. A state Voters’ Pamphlet is mailed to every household in Oregon about three weeks before each statewide election. It includes information about each measure and candidate in the upcoming election.

In a 2020 study, Oregon was ranked as the easiest state for citizens to vote in.

Voter registration 
Resident citizens of Oregon can register to vote with or without a political party. Monthly and annual voter registration statistics are published by the Oregon Secretary of State.

Online 
In March 2010, Oregon became the fourth state in the country (along with Arizona, Washington, and Kansas) to allow online voter registration.

Automatic 
In March 2015, the Oregon legislature passed a bill to adopt an automatic voter registration procedure using information from the State DMV. The state has roughly 2.2 million registered voters out of an estimated 3 million eligible voters  and the bill will potentially register half of the 800,000 unregistered, eligible voters. Eligible individuals found through the system will have 21 days to opt-out or register with a political party; otherwise they will be automatically registered to vote as "Non-affiliated" with any party.

Campaign finance 

The Oregon Constitution allows for a broader right to free speech than at the federal level including the topic of political campaign donations. The Oregon Supreme Court has consistently ruled that campaign contribution limits are a violation of free speech and has struck down many laws and ballot measures that enacted contribution limits. As a result of these rulings, Oregon is one of the only four states that have no campaign contribution limits of any kind.

The most recent attempt to enact campaign contribution limits was Ballot measures 46 and 47 in 2006. Measure 47 passed, but 46 did not, and in the absence of the kind of Constitutional support it would have provided, 47 did not take effect.

Women's suffrage 
In 1912, Oregon became the seventh U.S. state to permit women to vote. The amendment to the Oregon Constitution, passed by ballot initiative, was largely the result of decades of advocacy by Abigail Scott Duniway, who founded a weekly newspaper, The New Northwest, in part to promote voting rights for women. The National Women's Suffrage Association recognized Duniway as a leading women's advocate in the American West in 1886.

Women became eligible to run for the state legislature in 1914; within a year, women had won seats in both its houses.

The Oregon System

In Oregon, the initiative and referendum process dates back to 1902, when the efforts of the Direct Legislation League prompted Oregon to amend its Constitution for the first time since 1859. The process of initiative and referendum became nationally known as the Oregon System.

There are three types of ballot measures that may appear on statewide ballots: initiatives, referendums, and referrals. Initiatives and referendums may be placed on the ballot if their supporters gather enough signatures from Oregon voters; the number of signatures is a percentage based on the number of voters casting ballots in the most recent election for the Governor of Oregon.

 initiative Any issue may be placed before the voters, either amending the Constitution or revising or adding to the Oregon Revised Statutes. Constitutional initiatives require the signature of 8% of recent voters to qualify for the ballot; statutory reforms require 6%.
 referendum The public may act to undo any bill passed by the Oregon Legislative Assembly, by putting a referendum on the ballot. A referendum requires 4% of recent voters to qualify for the ballot.
 referral The Legislative Assembly may refer any bill it passes to the public for approval, and must do so for any amendment to the Constitution. Additionally, the Legislative Assembly may refer revisions to the Constitution; a revision differs from an amendment in that it may alter multiple provisions of the Constitution.

The constitutional foundation for ballot measures (and legislation produced by the Oregon Legislative Assembly) may be found in Article IV of the Oregon Constitution, and Chapter 250 of the Oregon Revised Statutes relates to initiative and referendum as well.

Oregon voters have acted on 851 statewide ballot measures (359 initiatives, 64 referendums, and 428 legislative referrals) since the system was introduced in 1902.

Vote by Mail

History
The VBM system was first approved for testing by the Oregon Legislature for local elections in 1981. The system met with fairly widespread success and was made permanent for the majority of counties for local/special elections in 1987. It was used for the first statewide special election in 1993. The Oregon Legislature approved a proposal to expand VBM to primary and general elections in the spring of 1995, but Governor John Kitzhaber vetoed the bill. However, by January 1996, Oregon became the first state to conduct a general election totally by mail to fill a vacancy in a federal office when it elected Senator Ron Wyden to replace Bob Packwood with a 66 percent turnout.

In June 1998 supporters of expanding VBM to primary and general elections used the initiative to put the issue on the November general election ballot as Measure 60. No paid signature gatherers were used to put the measure on the ballot – a first since 1994, and on November 3, 1998 Oregon voters decide to expand VBM to primary and general elections by a vote of 757,204 to 334,021.

In the 2000 election cycle, Oregon for the first time used VBM in a Presidential Primary election and then a Presidential General election, with a 79 percent turnout.

Voters' Pamphlet
A state Voters' Pamphlet is mailed to every household in Oregon about 3 weeks before each statewide election. It includes information about each measure and candidate in the upcoming election. If a voter does not receive a Voters' Pamphlet, they can order or pick one up from any County Elections Office, or the Secretary of State's Office. Some counties may print a voters’ pamphlet with local measures and candidates as well and these may be included with the state pamphlet or mailed separately.

For each statewide election, the Voters' Pamphlet is also available in an accessible online format at the Oregon Secretary of State's Election Division Website. An audio Voters' Guide is also available for each statewide election.

Copies of historical voters' pamphlets from Marion County (containing most statewide races and ballot measures) are online at the Oregon State Library.

Balloting
Ballots packs are mailed to every registered voter 14 to 18 days before the election. When the ballot pack comes in the mail, it includes:

An official ballot
A secrecy envelope
A ballot return envelope

After filling out the ballot the voter then places the ballot in the secrecy envelope, then inside the return envelope and must then sign it in a space provided on the outside return envelope. This is then either mailed back through the US mail with first class postage, or dropped off at any County Elections Office or a designated dropsite. Ballots must be received in a County Elections Office or postmarked by 8pm on Election Day. 

Once received, an Elections Official at the elections office where the ballot is received will compare the signature on the ballot return envelope to the signature on the voter registration card to verify that the voter is registered to vote. Once verified, the secrecy envelope containing the actual ballot is removed and polled with the other ballots. Once the "polls" close at 8pm on Election Day, the ballots are removed from their secrecy envelopes and counted.

Recent elections

1996 elections
United States presidential election in Oregon, 1996
United States Senate election in Oregon, 1996
United States Senate special election in Oregon, 1996
United States House of Representatives elections in Oregon, 1996

1998 elections
United States Senate election in Oregon, 1998
United States House of Representatives elections in Oregon, 1998
Oregon gubernatorial election, 1998

2000 elections
United States presidential election in Oregon, 2000
United States House of Representatives elections in Oregon, 2000

2002 elections
United States Senate election in Oregon, 2002
United States House of Representatives elections in Oregon, 2002
Oregon gubernatorial election, 2002

2004 elections
United States presidential election in Oregon, 2004
United States Senate election in Oregon, 2004
United States House of Representatives elections in Oregon, 2004

2006 elections
Oregon's statewide elections, 2006
United States House of Representatives elections in Oregon, 2006
Oregon gubernatorial election, 2006

2008 elections

Presidential race

The 2008 presidential, senatorial and congressional elections in Oregon were held on November 4, 2008, to determine the President, Oregon's junior United States senator, and who would represent the state of Oregon in the United States House of Representatives.

Democratic Presidential candidate Barack Obama won 56.7% of Oregon's vote in 2008, soundly defeating Republican candidate John McCain. Most rural counties favored McCain, though Obama improved the Democratic tickets performance than John Kerry did in 2004, and Obama's strong support in the more urban Willamette Valley allowed him to win the state decisively.

U.S. Senate race

The Oregon Senate Election of 2008 was held on November 4, 2008. Republican Senator Gordon Smith was seeking re-election. Smith was the only Republican Senator from the west coast (excluding Alaska) and the only Republican currently holding statewide office in Oregon. He was opposed by Democrat Jeff Merkley, the Speaker of the Oregon House of Representatives and David Brownlow of the Constitution Party of Oregon. Merkley won by a narrow margin, with Smith conceding two days after the election.

U.S. House races

The 2008 congressional elections in Oregon were held on November 4, 2008, to determine who will represent the state of Oregon in the United States House of Representatives, coinciding with the presidential and senatorial elections. Oregon's five seats in the House, apportioned according to the 2000 United States Census. Both prior to and following the election consists of four Democrats and one Republican. This remains unchanged although CQ Politics had forecasted district 5 to be at some risk for the incumbent party.

The only competitive race was the Oregon's 5th congressional district which had been represented by Democrat Darlene Hooley since 1996. In February 2008, she announced that she would not seek re-election in 2008. The race to replace her was expected to be one of the most competitive in the nation, since the district contained about 2,000 more Republicans than Democrats at that time.

Despite the initial closeness of the race, Democratic nominee Kurt Schrader won against Republican nominee Mike Erickson, 166,070 (54.5%) to 116,418 (38.2%) who had been winner of a contentious primary in which an opponent, Kevin Mannix, raised an allegation that Erickson paid for a former girlfriend's abortion. The girlfriend subsequently went public with the information, but Erickson denied knowledge of the event. Mannix refused to endorse Erickson in the general election.

Oregon's statewide elections, 2008

2010 elections
Oregon state elections, 2010
Oregon legislative elections, 2010
United States House of Representatives elections in Oregon, 2010
United States Senate election in Oregon, 2010
Oregon gubernatorial election, 2010

2012 elections
United States presidential election in Oregon, 2012
Oregon's 1st congressional district special election, 2012
United States House of Representatives elections in Oregon, 2012
Oregon state elections, 2012
Oregon legislative elections, 2012
Portland, Oregon mayoral election, 2012

2014 elections
United States Senate election in Oregon, 2014
United States House of Representatives elections in Oregon, 2014
Oregon gubernatorial election, 2014
Oregon state elections, 2014
Oregon legislative elections, 2014

2016 elections
United States presidential election in Oregon, 2016
United States Senate election in Oregon, 2016
United States House of Representatives elections in Oregon, 2016
Oregon gubernatorial special election, 2016
2016 Oregon Secretary of State election
Oregon state elections, 2016
Oregon legislative elections, 2016
Portland, Oregon mayoral election, 2016

2018 elections
United States House of Representatives elections in Oregon, 2018
Oregon gubernatorial election, 2018
Oregon state elections, 2018
Oregon legislative elections, 2018

2020 elections 

 2020 United States presidential election in Oregon
 2020 United States Senate election in Oregon
 2020 United States House of Representatives elections in Oregon
 2020 Oregon Secretary of State election
 2020 Oregon Attorney General election
 2020 Oregon State Treasurer election
 2020 Oregon House of Representatives election
 2020 Oregon State Senate election
 2020 Portland, Oregon mayoral election

2022 elections 
 2022 United States Senate election in Oregon
 2022 United States House of Representatives elections in Oregon
 2022 Oregon House of Representatives election
 2022 Oregon State Senate election

See also
Politics of Oregon
Political party strength in Oregon
Elections in the United States
United States presidential elections in Oregon
Politics of the United States
Oregon elections
 with notes on all changes related to voting and elections

Notes

External links
Elections Division at the Oregon Secretary of State official website
Election history
Elections at the Oregon Blue Book

 
 
  (State affiliate of the U.S. League of Women Voters)
 

 
Government of Oregon
Political events in Oregon